Babatpur is a village, near Varanasi city in Pindra Tehsil of Varanasi district in the Indian state of Uttar Pradesh. The village falls under gram panchayat by the same name as the village. The village also houses Lal Bahadur Shastri Airport (a.k.a. Babatpur Airport) which serves Varanasi district. The village is about 26 kilometers North-West of Varanasi city, 260 kilometers South-East of state capital Lucknow and 797 kilometers South-East of the national capital New Delhi.

Demography
Babatpur has a total population of 2,293 people amongst 339 families. Sex ratio of the village is 897 and child sex ratio is 811. Uttar Pradesh state average for both ratios is 912 and 902 respectively .

Transportation
Babatpur can be accessed by air (Lal Bahadur Shastri Airport), train (Babatpur railway station) and by road. Nearest operational airports are Varanasi airport (500 meters) and Allahabad Airports (137 kilometres West).

See also

Pindra Tehsil
Pindra (Assembly constituency)

Notes
  All demographic data is based on 2011 Census of India.

References 

Villages in Varanasi district